Yrjö Korholin-Koski (3 May 1900 – 2 March 1978) was a Finnish long-distance runner. Korholin-Koski emigrated to the United States in 1924. He competed in the marathon at the 1928 Summer Olympics and finished seventh. He competed in the 50,000-meter walk in 1932.

References

1900 births
1978 deaths
Finnish male long-distance runners
Athletes (track and field) at the 1928 Summer Olympics
Olympic athletes of Finland
Finnish emigrants to the United States
Athletes from Helsinki